Mycobacterium psychrotolerans is a rapidly growing mycobacterium first isolated from pond water near a uranium mine in Spain. It was able to grow at 4°C and is therefore considered to be psychrotolerant.

Description
Microscopy
Gram-positive, acid-fast, non-spore-forming, non-motile short rods.

Colony characteristics
Smooth, entire, bright orange, scotochromogenic colonies appear after 2 days in GYEA, Bennett's and nutrient agars.

Physiology
Growth on Lowenstein–Jensen agar is moderate.
No growth occurs on MacConkey agar.
Grows at 4–37C and tolerates 7% NaCl.
The type strain is resistant to ampicillin, cefuroxime, cloxacillin, erythromycin, penicillin and polymyxin. Sensitive to ciprofloxacin, gentamicin, neomycin and oxytetracycline.

Differential characteristics
Growth at 4°C.

Pathogenesis
First isolated from an environmental source, not known to be pathogenic.

Type strain
The type strain was isolated from a pond in Salamanca, Spain.
Strain WA101 = DSM 44697 = JCM 13323 = LMG 21953

References

Trujillo M.E.,et al., 2004. Mycobacterium psychrotolerans sp. nov., isolated from pond water near a uranium mine. Int. J. Syst. Evol. Microbiol., 54, 1459–1463.

External links
Type strain of Mycobacterium psychrotolerans at BacDive -  the Bacterial Diversity Metadatabase

Acid-fast bacilli
psychrotolerans
Bacteria described in 2004